Franz August Otto Pieper (June 27, 1852 – June 3, 1931) was a Confessional Lutheran theologian who also served as the fourth president of what was known at that time as the German Evangelical Lutheran Synod of Missouri, Ohio, and Other States (Missouri Synod).

Pieper was born at Karwitz, Pomerania, ( west of Danzig) and died in St. Louis, Missouri. After studying at the gymnasium of Kolberg, Pomerania, he emigrated to the United States in 1870. He graduated from Northwestern College in Watertown, Wisconsin, in 1872 and from Concordia Seminary in St. Louis in 1875. He was a Lutheran pastor from 1875 to 1878, serving first at Centerville, Wisconsin, and then at Manitowoc, Wisconsin. He became a professor of theology at Concordia Seminary in 1878, and in 1887 he became president of the same institution. He also served as editor of Lehre und Wehre, the faculty journal of Concordia Seminary.

From 1882 to 1899, Pieper served on the Board of Colored Missions for the Evangelical Lutheran Synodical Conference of North America. He then served as the fourth president of the Missouri Synod from 1899 to 1911.

As a systematic theologian, Franz Pieper's magnum opus, Christliche Dogmatik (1917–1924), provided the modern world with a learned and extensive presentation of orthodox Lutheran theology. Translated into English as Christian Dogmatics (1950–1953), it continues to be the basic textbook of doctrinal theology in the Missouri Synod. He was also the main author of A Brief Statement of 1932, an authoritative presentation of the synod's doctrinal stance.

Works 
Christliche Dogmatik. 4 vols. (St. Louis: Concordia Publishing House, 1917–1924) [English translation: Christian Dogmatics. 4 vols. (St. Louis: Concordia Publishing House, 1950–1953)](In German, public domain) Vol I Vol II Vol III

The Synodical Conference, an essay in The Distinctive Doctrines and Usages of the General Bodies of the Evangelical Lutheran Church in the United States (Philadelphia, 1892), 119-166.
Gesetz und Evangelium (1892)
Das Grundbekenntnis der evangelisch-lutherischen Kirche (St. Louis: Concordia Publishing House, 1880).
Lehre von der Rechtfertigung (1889)
Unsere Stellung in Lehre und Praxis (St. Louis, 1896)
Lehrstellung der Missouri-Synode (1897)
Christ's Work (1898).
Das Wesen des Christentums (1903)
Conversion and Election : a Plea for a United Lutheranism (1913, HathiTrust Digital Library)
What Is Christianity and Other Essays. John Theodore Mueller, tr. (St. Louis: Concordia Publishing House, 1933)

References

External links
 Concordia Historical Institute
Franz August Otto Pieper, The 20th Century Luther
 Our Position in Doctrine and Practice by Dr. Franz Pieper
 Lectures on the Evangelical Lutheran Church, The True Visible Church of God on Earth by Dr. Franz Pieper, trans. by Bryce L. Winters
 The Glorious Blessing of Brotherly Fellowship in Faith by Dr. Franz Pieper
 Theses on Unionism by Dr. Franz Pieper
 The Witness of History for Scripture (Homologoumena and Antilegomena) by Dr. Franz Pieper, (from Christian Dogmatics, Vol I, page 330-38.)
 The Distinction Between Orthodox & Heterodox Churches by Dr. Franz Pieper, (from Christian Dogmatics, Vol III)
C. F. W. Walther as a Theologian, by Dr. Franz Pieper, Studium Excitare, Issue #8.
 
 
Zur Einigung der amerikanisch-lutherischen Kirche in der Lehre von der Bekehrung und Gnadenwahl by Dr. Franz Pieper (1913)
Lehre und Wehre 8 Vols. of the faculty journal from Concordia Seminary

1852 births
1931 deaths
People from Sławno County
People from the Province of Pomerania
Martin Luther College
Presidents of the Lutheran Church–Missouri Synod
American Lutheran theologians
German emigrants to the United States
Religious leaders from Wisconsin
Seminary presidents
German Lutherans
19th-century American Lutheran clergy
Concordia Seminary alumni
20th-century American Lutheran clergy
19th-century Lutheran theologians
20th-century Lutheran theologians